Tumanovsky is a rural locality (a selo) and the administrative center of Tumanovsky Selsoviet of Zavyalovsky District, Altai Krai, Russia. The population was 525 as of 2016. There are 6 streets.

Geography 
Tumanovsky is located in the Kulunda Plain, 15 km west of Zavyalovo (the district's administrative centre) by road. Alexeyevka is the nearest rural locality.

Ethnicity 
The settlement is inhabited by Russians and others.

References 

Rural localities in Zavyalovsky District, Altai Krai